Phorminx is also a genus of cylindrical bark beetles.

The phorminx was one of the oldest of the Ancient Greek stringed musical instruments, in the yoke lutes family, intermediate between the lyre and the kithara. It consisted of two to seven strings, richly decorated arms and a crescent-shaped sound box. It most probably originated from Mesopotamia. While it seems to have been common in Homer's day, accompanying the rhapsodes, it was supplanted in historical times by the seven-stringed kithara. Nevertheless, the term phorminx continued to be used as an archaism in poetry.

The term phorminx is also sometimes used in both ancient and modern writing to refer to all four instruments of the lyre family collectively:

barbitos
kithara
lyre

External links
Ancient Greek Instruments, Homo Ecumenicus

Ancient Greek musical instruments
Lyres